The 1938 Copa Ibarguren was the 15th edition of the national cup of Argentina. It was played by the champions of both leagues, Primera División and Asociación Rosarina de Fútbol crowned during 1938.

Independiente (Primera División champion) faced Rosario Central (Liga Rosarina champion) at San Lorenzo de Almagro's venue, Estadio Gasómetro, in the Boedo neighborhood of Buenos Aires, on February 4, 1939. With three goals by forward Vicente de la Mata and two by striker Arsenio Erico, Independiente beat Central 5–3 and won its first Copa Ibarguren trophy. 

By winning the Copa Ibarguren, Independiente had now won all of the competitions contested in Argentina in 1938 as the team had won the 1938 Copa Aldao two months earlier by beating Peñarol .

Qualified teams

Match details

References 

Club Atlético Independiente matches
Rosario Central matches
1938 in Argentine football
1938 in South American football